The Chevrolet Series BA Confederate (or Chevrolet Confederate) is an American vehicle manufactured by Chevrolet in 1932 to replace the 1931 Series AE Independence. Production slipped significantly from over 600,000 cars to 323,100 for the model year as the Great Depression continued, but was still sufficient for Chevrolet to retain first place in the American car sales table. Sales were also affected by cross-town rival Ford introducing the Ford V8 coupe and sedan. A new body style called a station wagon was produced in limited quantities by coachbuilder Mifflinburg Body Company of Mifflinburg, Pennsylvania.

Specifications 

The Series BA carried over much from the Series AE and the main external differences were the sloping of the windshield and the removal of the external visor above. Once model year 1932 Chevrolet offered fourteen different body style choices, which were all supplied by Fisher Body and continued the program of devoting production to different factories for national consumption. The choices were now broken into "Standard" and "Deluxe" and one distinguishing feature was that on either side of the hood the previous louvers were replaced by opening vents, finished in a distinctive chrome on DeLuxe models. Flint Assembly, Buffalo Assembly and Janesville Assembly provided more than one coachwork choice due to production capacity. In May of 1925 the Chevrolet Export Boxing plant at Bloomfield, New Jersey was repurposed from a previous owner where Knock-down kits for Chevrolet, Oakland, Oldsmobile, Buick and Cadillac passenger cars, and both Chevrolet and G. M. C. truck parts are crated and shipped by railroad to the docks at Weehawken, New Jersey for overseas GM assembly factories.

It remained powered by the  "Stovebolt" six-cylinder engine, but now upgraded with a downdraft carburetor and a higher compression ratio to produce . A three-speed synchro-mesh transmission was fitted and a "Free Wheeling" mode called Wizard Control was standard, which permitted the car to coast when the driver's foot was lifted from the accelerator.

The electrical system was 6 Volt Negative ground, dual front (referred to as "Town and Country") horns and a passenger side Brake and Parking lights were options that could have been added on at either the dealership or factory.  Turn signal systems had not yet been implemented, the generator used a "Cut-out" relay which only used 1 wire for its generating system. Voltage regulators weren't implemented until 1935.

See also
1932 Cadillac Series 355
1932 LaSalle Series 303
1932 Oldsmobile F-Series
1932 Buick Series 50
1932 Pontiac Six Series 402

References 

Series BA Confederate
Cars introduced in 1932
1930s cars